
Radom County is a unit of territorial administration and local government (powiat) in Masovian Voivodeship, east-central Poland. It came into being on January 1, 1999, as a result of the Polish local government reforms passed in 1998. Its administrative seat is the city of Radom, although the city is not part of the county (it constitutes a separate city county).

As of 2019 its total population is 152,190, out of which the population of Pionki is 18,269, that of Iłża is 4,733, that of Skaryszew is 4,371, and the rural population is 124,817.

Neighbouring counties
Apart from the city of Radom, Radom County is also bordered by Białobrzegi County to the north, Kozienice County to the north-east, Zwoleń County to the east, Lipsko County to the south-east, Starachowice County to the south, Szydłowiec County to the south-west and Przysucha County to the west.

Administrative division
The county is subdivided into 13 gminas (one urban, two urban-rural and 10 rural). These are listed in the following table, in descending order of population.

Radom County in the Past  
The history of Radom County dates back to the Middle Ages, when the city of Radom was the seat of a castellany. In the first half of the 14th century, the castellanies were changed into counties, and newly created Radom County became part of Lesser Polands’ Sandomierz Voivodeship. In 1476, there were seven counties in this voivodeship: Sandomierz, Wislica, Checiny, Opoczno, Stezyca and Radom.

Boundaries of Radom County remained unchanged for centuries, until the Partitions of Poland. At that time, it was much larger than contemporary county: its total area was 5782 sq. kilometers, with such towns, as Ilza, Skaryszew, Szydlowiec, Wierzbnik, Skrzynno, Sieciechow, Solec nad Wisla and Kozienice. Eastern and northern boundaries of Radom County also marked borders of Lesser Poland, in the west, it bordered Opoczno County of Sandomierz Voivodeship, and in the south, Sandomierz County of Sandomierz Voivodeship.

After the third partition of Poland, Radom County became part of Radom Department of the Duchy of Warsaw. In 1816, Sandomierz Voivodeship was recreated, with its seat in Radom. In 1837, Radom County became part of Radom Governorate of Russian-controlled Congress Poland. In the Second Polish Republic, Radom County was part of Kielce Voivodeship (1919–39).

References

External links

 
Radom
Radom